Allen Grove is an unincorporated community in Cocke County, Tennessee, in the United States.

History
Allen Grove was named for Isaac Allen, who donated the land where a church and schoolhouse stood.

References

Unincorporated communities in Cocke County, Tennessee
Unincorporated communities in Tennessee